The Narita Yume Bokujo narrow gauge railway (Japanese 成田ゆめ牧場軽便鉄道) or Makiba Line (まきば線) is an approximately  long narrow gauge heritage railway with a track gauge of  near the Japanese City of Narita in Chiba Prefecture. The railway is operated on several days per year by the Rasuchijin Railway Association (羅須地人鉄道協会).

History 
The railway is located at Narita Dream Dairy Farm, a  agriculture theme park close to Tokyo Narita Airport. Visitors to the farm can watch milk production, and buy ice cream and yoghurt produced there.

Rolling stock 
  Feldbahn steam locomotive No. 3
  Kato Works diesel locomotive No. 5
  Feldbahn steam locomotive No. 6
  Porter steam locomotive No. 7
  Muff Potter vertical boiler No. 11
 Additional locomotives, passenger carriages and goods wagons

External links 
 羅須地人鉄道協会まきば線によ (Luo Qian Railway Association of the Makiba Line) (Japanese).
 Narita Yume Bokujo - Narita Dream Dairy Farm (English)

References 

Narita, Chiba
2 ft gauge railways in Japan
Rail transport in Japan
Heritage railways in Japan